Joseph Roger "Broadway" Jenkins (November 18, 1911 – May 4, 1994) was an American-born Canadian ice hockey player who played 327 games in the National Hockey League.  He played for the Toronto Maple Leafs, New York Americans, Montreal Canadiens, Montreal Maroons, Boston Bruins, and Chicago Black Hawks. A native of Appleton, Wisconsin, Jenkins moved to Port Arthur, Ontario where he learned to play hockey. He won the Stanley Cup with Chicago in 1934 and 1938. During the 'Hawks Stanley Cup victory parade in 1934, he carted goaltender Charlie Gardiner around the Chicago Loop in a wheelbarrow, fulfilling a pre-playoff bet he made with the Hall of Fame goaltender.

Career statistics

Regular season and playoffs

Transactions
Signed as a free agent by the Chicago Black Hawks, October 28, 1930.
Loaned to the Toronto Maple Leafs by the Chicago Black Hawks, December 4, 1930.
Returned to the Chicago Black Hawks by the Toronto Maple Leafs, February 3, 1931.
Traded by the Chicago Black Hawks with Leroy Goldsworthy and Lionel Conacher to the Montreal Canadiens for Lorne Chabot, Howie Morenz and Marty Burke, October 3, 1934.
Traded by the Montreal Canadiens to the Boston Bruins for Jean Pusie, Walt Buswell and cash, July 13, 1935.
Traded by the Boston Bruins with Babe Siebert to the Montreal Canadiens for Leroy Goldsworthy, Sammy McManus and $10,000, September 10, 1936.
Signed as a free agent by the Montreal Maroons, December 17, 1936.
Loaned to the New York Americans by the Montreal Maroons, January 1, 1937.
Signed as a free agent by the Chicago Black Hawks, November 20, 1937.
Signed as a free agent by the New York Americans, January 1, 1939.
Traded by the New York Americans to the Springfield Indians of the IAHL for cash, October 2, 1939.

References

External links

1911 births
1994 deaths
American expatriate ice hockey players in Canada
American men's ice hockey defensemen
Boston Bruins players
Boston Cubs players
Bronx Tigers players
Chicago Blackhawks players
Hershey Bears players
Ice hockey people from Ontario
Ice hockey players from Wisconsin
Montreal Canadiens players
Montreal Maroons players
New York Americans players
Seattle Ironmen players
Sportspeople from Appleton, Wisconsin
Sportspeople from Thunder Bay
Springfield Indians players
Stanley Cup champions
Tacoma Rockets (WHL) players
Toronto Maple Leafs players
Washington Lions players